Truck art may refer to:

 Truck art in South Asia 
 Dekotora in Japan